Rautaruukki Oyj using the marketing name Ruukki is a Finnish company, headquartered in Helsinki, which manufactures and supplies metal-based components and systems to the construction and engineering industries. In 2014 Swedish SSAB bought Ruukki.

The company was founded in 1960 by the Finnish Government to provide the steel supply needed by the nation's heavy industries. Since part-privatization in 1994, the state has gradually decreased its holding in Rautaruukki.The firm consists of three business areas: construction, engineering and metals. Rautaruukki produces a range of products for clients in various industries, including cabins and chassis for heavy vehicles, hot rolled steel plates and coils, roofing sheets and building and bridge structures.

Ownership
On 31 December 2011the principal shareholders were:
Solidium Oy 39.67%
Ilmarinen Mutual Pension Insurance Company	3.72%
Varma Mutual Pension Insurance Company	2.51%
The State Pension Fund	1.39%	
Odin - Funds 1.03%

References

Further reading

External links

Manufacturing companies based in Helsinki
Steel companies of Finland
Manufacturing companies established in 1960
Finnish brands
1960 establishments in Finland